Alvin Cullum York (December 13, 1887 – September 2, 1964), also known as Sergeant York,  was one of the most decorated  United States Army soldiers of World War I. He received the Medal of Honor for leading an attack on a German machine gun nest, gathering 35 machine guns, killing at least 25 enemy soldiers and capturing 132 prisoners. York's Medal of Honor action occurred during the United States-led portion of the Meuse–Argonne offensive in France, which was intended to breach the Hindenburg line and force the Germans to surrender. He earned decorations from several allied countries during WWI, including France, Italy and Montenegro.

York was born in rural Tennessee, in what is now the community of Pall Mall in Fentress County. His parents farmed, and his father worked as a blacksmith. The eleven York children had minimal schooling because they helped provide for the family, including hunting, fishing, and working as laborers. After the death of his father, York assisted in caring for his younger siblings and found work as a blacksmith. Despite being a regular churchgoer, York also drank heavily and was prone to fistfights. After a 1914 conversion experience, he vowed to improve and became even more devoted to the Church of Christ in Christian Union.  York was drafted during World War I; he initially claimed conscientious objector status on the grounds that his religious denomination forbade violence. Persuaded that his religion was not incompatible with military service, York joined the 82nd Division as an infantry private and went to France in 1918.

In October 1918, Private First Class (Acting Corporal) York was one of a group of seventeen soldiers assigned to infiltrate German lines and silence a machine gun position. After the American patrol had captured a large group of enemy soldiers, German small arms fire killed six Americans and wounded three. Several of the Americans returned fire while others guarded the prisoners. York and the other Americans attacked the machine gun position, killing several German soldiers. The German officer responsible for the machine gun position had emptied his pistol while firing at York but failed to hit him. This officer then offered to surrender and York accepted. York and his men marched back to their unit's command post with more than 130 prisoners. York was later promoted to sergeant and was awarded the Distinguished Service Cross. An investigation resulted in the upgrading of the award to the Medal of Honor. York's feat made him a national hero and international celebrity among allied nations.

After Armistice Day, a group of Tennessee businessmen purchased a farm for York, his new wife, and their growing family. He later formed a charitable foundation to improve educational opportunities for children in rural Tennessee. In the 1930s and 1940s, York worked as a project superintendent for the Civilian Conservation Corps and managed construction of the Byrd Lake reservoir at Cumberland Mountain State Park, after which he served for several years as park superintendent. A 1941 film about his World War I exploits, Sergeant York, was that year's highest-grossing film; Gary Cooper won the Academy Award for Best Actor for his portrayal of York, and the film was credited with enhancing American morale as the US mobilized for action in World War II. In his later years, York was confined to bed by health problems. He died in Nashville, Tennessee, in 1964 and was buried at Wolf River Cemetery in his hometown of Pall Mall, Tennessee.

Early life 
Alvin Cullum York was born in a two-room log cabin in Fentress County, Tennessee. He was the third child born to William Uriah York and Mary Elizabeth (Brooks) York. William Uriah York was born in Jamestown, Tennessee, to Uriah York and Eliza Jane Livingston, who had moved to Tennessee from Buncombe County, North Carolina. Mary Elizabeth York was born in Pall Mall to William Brooks, who took his mother's maiden name as an alias of William H. Harrington after deserting from Company A of the 11th Michigan Cavalry Regiment during the American Civil War, and Nancy Pyle, and was the great-granddaughter of Conrad "Coonrod" Pyle, an English settler who settled Pall Mall, Tennessee.

William York and Mary Brooks married on December 25, 1881, and had eleven children: Henry Singleton, Joseph Marion, Alvin Cullum, Samuel John, Albert, Hattie, George Alexander, James Preston, Lillian Mae, Robert Daniel, and Lucy Erma. The York family is mainly of English ancestry, with Scots-Irish ancestry as well. The family resided in the Indian Creek area of Fentress County. The family was impoverished, with William York working as a blacksmith to supplement the family's income. The men of the York family farmed and harvested their own food, while the mother made all of the family's clothing. The York sons attended school for only nine months and withdrew from education because William York needed them to help work on the family farm, hunt, and fish to help feed the family. When William York died in November 1911, his son Alvin helped his mother raise his younger siblings. Alvin was the oldest sibling still residing in the county, since his two older brothers had married and relocated. To supplement the family's income, York worked in Harriman, Tennessee, first in railroad construction and then as a logger. By all accounts, he was a skilled laborer who was devoted to the welfare of his family, and a crack shot. York was also a violent alcoholic prone to fighting in saloons. In one of the saloon fights his best friend was killed. York also accumulated several arrests within the area. His mother, a member of a pacifist Protestant denomination, tried to persuade York to change his ways.

World War I

Despite his history of drinking and fighting, York attended church regularly and often led the hymn singing. A revival meeting at the end of 1914 led him to a conversion experience on January 1, 1915. His congregation was the Church of Christ in Christian Union, a Protestant denomination that shunned secular politics and disputes between Christian denominations. This church had no specific doctrine of pacifism but it had been formed in reaction to the Methodist Episcopal Church, South's support of slavery, including armed conflict during the American Civil War, and it opposed all forms of violence. In a lecture later in life, York reported his reaction to the outbreak of World War I: "I was worried clean through. I didn't want to go and kill. I believed in my Bible."

On June 5, 1917, at the age of 29, Alvin York registered for the draft as all men between 21 and 30 years of age were required to do as a result of the Selective Service Act. When he registered for the draft, he answered the question "Do you claim exemption from draft (specify grounds)?" by writing "Yes. Don't Want To Fight." When his initial claim for conscientious objector status was denied, he appealed. During World War I, conscientious objector status did not exempt the objector from military duty. Such individuals could still be drafted and were given assignments that did not conflict with their anti-war principles. In November 1917, while York's application was considered, he was drafted and began his army service at Camp Gordon, Georgia.

From the day he registered for the draft until he returned from the war on May 29, 1919, York kept a diary of his activities. In his diary, York wrote that he refused to sign documents provided by his pastor seeking a discharge from the Army on religious grounds and similar documents provided by his mother asserting a claim of exemption as the sole support of his mother and siblings. Despite his initial, signed request for an exemption, he later disclaimed ever having been a conscientious objector.

Entry into service
York served in Company G, 328th Infantry, 82nd Division. Deeply troubled by the conflict between his pacifism and his training for war, he spoke at length with his company commander, Captain Edward Courtney Bullock Danforth Jr. (1894–1974) of Augusta, Georgia, and his battalion commander, Major G. Edward Buxton of Providence, Rhode Island, a devout Christian himself. Biblical passages about violence ("He that hath no sword, let him sell his cloak and buy one." "Render unto Caesar ..." "... if my kingdom were of this world, then would my servants fight.") cited by Danforth persuaded York to reconsider the morality of his participation in the war. Granted a 10-day leave to visit home, he returned convinced that God meant for him to fight and would keep him safe, as committed to his new mission as he had been to pacifism. He served with his division in the St. Mihiel Offensive.

Medal of Honor action

In an October 8, 1918, attack that occurred during the Meuse–Argonne offensive, York's battalion aimed to capture German positions near Hill 223 along the Decauville railroad north of Chatel-Chéhéry, France. His actions that day earned him the Medal of Honor. He later recalled:

Under the command of Cpl. (Acting Sergeant) Bernard Early, four non-commissioned officers, including Acting Corporal York, and thirteen privates were ordered to infiltrate the German lines to take out the machine guns. The group worked their way behind the Germans and overran the headquarters of a German unit, capturing a large group of German soldiers who were preparing a counter-attack against the U.S. troops. Early's men were contending with the prisoners when German machine gun fire suddenly peppered the area, killing six Americans and wounding three others. Several of the Americans returned fire while others guarded the prisoners. From his advantageous position, York fought the Germans. York recalled:

During the assault, a German officer led several Germans to the scene of the fighting and ran into York who shot several of them with his pistol.

Imperial German Army First Lieutenant Paul Jürgen Vollmer, commanding the 120th Reserve Infantry Regiment's 1st Battalion, emptied his pistol trying to kill York while he was contending with the machine guns. Failing to injure York, and seeing his mounting losses, he offered in English to surrender the unit to York who accepted. At the end of the engagement, York and his seven men marched their German prisoners back to the American lines. Upon returning to his unit, York reported to his brigade commander, Brigadier General Julian Robert Lindsey, who remarked: "Well York, I hear you have captured the whole German army." York replied: "No sir. I got only 132."

York's actions silenced the German machine guns and were responsible for enabling the 328th Infantry to renew its attack to capture the Decauville Railroad.

Post-battle

York was promptly promoted to sergeant and received the Distinguished Service Cross. A few months later, an investigation by York's chain of command resulted in an upgrade of his Distinguished Service Cross to the Medal of Honor, which was presented by the commanding general of the American Expeditionary Forces, General John J. Pershing. The French Republic awarded him the Croix de Guerre, Medaille Militaire and Legion of Honor.

In addition to his French medals, Italy awarded York the Croce al Merito di Guerra and Montenegro decorated him with its War Medal. He eventually received nearly 50 decorations.
York's Medal of Honor citation reads:

In attempting to explain his actions during the 1919 investigation that resulted in the Medal of Honor, York told General Lindsey "A higher power than man guided and watched over me and told me what to do." Lindsey replied "York, you are right."

Biographer David D. Lee (2000) wrote:

Homecoming and fame
Before leaving France, York was his division's noncommissioned officer delegate to the caucus which created the American Legion, of which York was a charter member.

York's heroism went unnoticed in the United States press, even in Tennessee, until the publication of the April 26, 1919, issue of the Saturday Evening Post, which had a circulation in excess of 2 million. In an article titled "The Second Elder Gives Battle", journalist George Pattullo, who had learned of York's story while touring battlefields earlier in the year, laid out the themes that have dominated York's story ever since: the mountaineer, his religious faith and skill with firearms, patriotic, plainspoken and unsophisticated, an uneducated man who "seems to do everything correctly by intuition." In response, the Tennessee Society, a group of Tennesseans living in New York City, arranged celebrations to greet York upon his return to the United States, including a 5-day furlough to allow for visits to New York City and Washington, D.C. York arrived in Hoboken, New Jersey, on May 22, stayed at the Waldorf Astoria, and attended a formal banquet in his honor. He toured the subway system in a special car before continuing to Washington, where the House of Representatives gave him a standing ovation and he met Secretary of War Newton D. Baker and the President's secretary Joe Tumulty, as President Wilson was still in Paris.

York proceeded to Fort Oglethorpe, Georgia, where he was discharged from the service, and then to Tennessee for more celebrations. He had been home for barely a week when, on June 7, 1919, York and Gracie Loretta Williams were married by Tennessee Governor Albert H. Roberts in Pall Mall. More celebrations followed the wedding, including a week-long trip to Nashville where York accepted a special medal awarded by the state.

York refused many offers to profit from his fame, including thousands of dollars offered for appearances, product endorsements, newspaper articles, and movie rights to his life story. Instead, he lent his name to various charitable and civic causes. To support economic development, he campaigned for the Tennessee government to build a road to service his native region, succeeding when a highway through the mountains was completed in the mid-1920s and named Alvin C. York Highway. The Nashville Rotary organized the purchase, by public subscription, of a  farm, the one gift that York accepted. However, it was not the fully equipped farm he was promised, requiring York to borrow money to stock it. He subsequently lost money in the farming depression that followed the war. Then the Rotary was unable to continue the installment payments on the property, leaving York to pay them himself. In 1921, he had no option but to seek public help, resulting in an extended discussion of his finances in the press, some of it sharply critical. Debt in itself was a trial: "I could get used to most any kind of hardship, but I'm not fitted for the hardship of owing money." Only an appeal to Rotary Clubs nationwide and an account of York's plight in the New York World brought in the required contributions by Christmas 1921.

After the war
In the 1920s, York formed the Alvin C. York Foundation with the mission of increasing educational opportunities in his region of Tennessee. Board members included the area's congressman, Cordell Hull, who later became Secretary of State under President Franklin D. Roosevelt, Secretary of the Treasury William G. McAdoo, who was President Wilson's son-in-law, and Tennessee Governor Albert Roberts. Plans called for a non-sectarian institution providing vocational training to be called the York Agricultural Institute. York concentrated on fund-raising, though he disappointed audiences who wanted to hear about the Argonne when he instead explained that "I occupied one space in a fifty mile front. I saw so little it hardly seems worthwhile discussing it. I'm trying to forget the war in the interest of the mountain boys and girls that I grew up among." He fought first to win financial support from the state and county, then battled local leaders about the school's location. Refusing to compromise, he resigned and developed plans for a rival York Industrial School. After a series of lawsuits he gained control of the original institution and was its president when it opened in December 1929. As the Great Depression deepened, the state government failed to provide promised funds, and York mortgaged his farm to fund bus transportation for students. Even after he was ousted as president in 1936 by political and bureaucratic rivals, he continued to donate money.

In 1935 York, sensing the end of his time with the institute, began to work as a project superintendent with the Civilian Conservation Corps overseeing the creation of Cumberland Mountain State Park's Byrd Lake, one of the largest masonry projects the program ever undertook. York served as the park's superintendent until 1940. In the second half of 1930s and early 1940s, in the run-up to the America's entry in World War II, York was a forceful and public advocate for interventionism, calling for U.S. involvement in the war against Germany, Italy and Japan. At the time, U.S. public opinion was overwhelmingly in favor of the isolationist and non-interventionist approach, and York's unpopular views led to accusations that he was engaged in war-mongering. York became a relatively rare high-profile public voice for intervention. In a speech at  the Tomb of the Unknown Soldier in May 1941, York said: "We must fight again! The time is not now ripe, nor will it ever be, to compromise with Hitler, or the things he stands for."

York's speeches attracted the attention of President Roosevelt, who frequently quoted York, particularly a passage from York's Tomb of the Unknown Soldier speech:

During World War II, York attempted to re-enlist in the Army.
However, at fifty-four years of age, overweight, near-diabetic, and with evidence of arthritis, he was denied enlistment as a combat soldier. Instead, he was commissioned as a major in the Army Signal Corps and he toured training camps and participated in bond drives in support of the war effort, usually paying his own travel expenses. Gen. Matthew Ridgway later recalled that York "created in the minds of farm boys and clerks ... the conviction that an aggressive soldier, well-trained and well-armed, can fight his way out of any situation." He also raised funds for war-related charities, including the Red Cross. He served on his county draft board and, when literacy requirements forced the rejection of large numbers of Fentress County men, he offered to lead a battalion of illiterates himself, saying they were "crack shots". Although York served during the war as a Signal Corps major and as a colonel with the 7th Regiment of the Tennessee State Guard, newspapers continued to refer to him as "Sergeant York".

Legacy and film story
Biographer David Lee explored the reason Americans responded so favorably to his story:

York cooperated with journalists in telling his life story twice in the 1920s. He allowed Nashville-born freelance journalist Sam Cowan to see his diary and submitted to interviews. The resulting 1922 biography focused on York's Appalachian background, describing his upbringing among the "purest Anglo-Saxons to be found today", emphasizing popular stereotypes without bringing the man to life. A few years later, York contacted a publisher about an edition of his war diary, but the publisher wanted additional material to flesh out the story. Then Tom Skeyhill, an Australian-born veteran of the Gallipoli campaign, visited York in Tennessee and the two became friends. On York's behalf, Skeyhill wrote an "autobiography" in the first person and was credited as the editor of Sergeant York: His Own Life Story and War Diary. With a preface by Newton D. Baker, Secretary of War in World War I, it presented a one-dimensional York supplemented with tales of life in the Tennessee mountains. Reviews noted that York only promoted his life story in the interest of funding educational programs: "Perhaps York's bearing after his famous exploit in the Argonne best reveals his native greatness. ... He will not exploit himself except for his own people. All of which gives his book an appeal beyond its contents."

The mountaineer persona Cowan and Skeyhill promoted reflected York's own beliefs. In a speech at the 1939 New York World's Fair, he said:

For many years, York employed a secretary, Arthur S. Bushing, who wrote the lectures and speeches York delivered. Bushing prepared York's correspondence as well. Like the works of Cowan and Skeyhill, words commonly ascribed to York, though doubtless representing his thinking, were often composed by professional writers. York had refused several times to authorize a film version of his life story. Finally, in 1940, as York was looking to finance an interdenominational Bible school, he yielded to a persistent Hollywood producer and negotiated the contract himself. In 1941 the movie Sergeant York, directed by Howard Hawks with Gary Cooper in the title role, told about his life and Medal of Honor action. The screenplay included much fictitious material though it was based on York's Diary. The marketing of the film included a visit by York to the White House where FDR praised the film. Some of the response to the film divided along political lines, with advocates of preparedness and aid to Great Britain enthusiastic ("Hollywood's first solid contribution to the national defense", said Time) and isolationists calling it "propaganda" for the administration. It received 11 Oscar nominations and won two, including the Academy Award for Best Actor for Cooper. It was the highest-grossing picture of 1941. York's earnings from the film, about $150,000 in the first two years as well as later royalties, resulted in a decade-long battle with the Internal Revenue Service. York eventually built part of his planned Bible school, which hosted 100 students until the late 1950s.

Political views
York originally believed in the morality of America's intervention in World War I. By the mid-1930s, he looked back more critically: "I can't see that we did any good. There's as much trouble now as there was when we were over there. I think the slogan 'A war to end war' is all wrong." He fully endorsed American preparedness, but showed sympathy for isolationism by saying that he would fight only if war came to America.

A consistent Democrat – "I'm a Democrat first, last, and all the time", he said – in January 1941 he praised FDR's support for Great Britain and in an address at the Tomb of the Unknown Soldier on Memorial Day of that year he attacked isolationists and said that veterans understood that "liberty and freedom are so very precious that you do not fight and win them once and stop." They are "prizes awarded only to those peoples who fight to win them and then keep fighting eternally to hold them!" At times he was blunt: "I think any man who talks against the interests of his own country ought to be arrested and put in jail, not excepting senators and colonels." Everyone knew that the colonel in question was Charles Lindbergh.

In the late 1940s he called for toughness in dealing with the Soviet Union and did not hesitate to recommend using the atomic bomb in a first strike: "If they can't find anyone else to push the button, I will." He questioned the failure of United Nations forces to use the atomic bomb in Korea. In the 1960s he criticized Secretary of Defense Robert McNamara's plans to reduce the ranks of the National Guard and reserves: "Nothing would please Khrushchev better."

Personal life and death

York and his wife Gracie had ten children, seven sons and three daughters, most named after American historical figures: Infant son (1920, died at 4 days), Alvin Cullum, Jr. (1921–1983), George Edward Buxton (1923–2018), Woodrow Wilson (1925–1998), Samuel Huston (1928–1929), Andrew Jackson (1930–2022), Betsy Ross (born 1933), Mary Alice (1935–1991), Thomas Jefferson (1938–1972), and Infant daughter (1940, died same day).

York had health problems throughout his life. He had gallbladder surgery in the late 1920s and had pneumonia in 1942. Described in 1919 as a "red-haired giant with the ruddy complexion of the outdoors" and "standing more than 6 feet ... and tipping the scale at more than 200 pounds", by 1945 he weighed 250 pounds and in 1948 he had a stroke. More strokes and another case of pneumonia followed, and he was confined to bed from 1954, further impaired by failing eyesight. He was hospitalized several times during his last two years. York died at the Veterans Hospital in Nashville, Tennessee, on September 2, 1964, of a cerebral hemorrhage at age 76. After a funeral service in his Jamestown church, with Gen. Matthew Ridgway representing President Lyndon Johnson, York was buried at the Wolf River Cemetery in Pall Mall. His funeral sermon was delivered by Richard G. Humble, General Superintendent of the Churches of Christ in Christian Union. Humble also preached Mrs. York's funeral sermon in 1984.

Awards
York was the recipient of the following awards:

Legacy

Controversy
Beginning soon after York's return to the United States at the end of the war, doubt and controversy periodically surfaced over whether the events detailed in his Medal of Honor documents had taken place as officially described, and whether other soldiers in York's unit should also have been recognized for their heroism. Otis Merrithew (William Cutting) and Bernard Early were among those who argued against the official version. Of the 17 American soldiers who were involved in York's Medal of Honor action, six were killed. York received the Medal of Honor, and over the years, three of the others who lived through that day's fighting also received valor awards, including the Distinguished Service Cross for Early in 1929, and the Silver Star for Merrithew in 1965.

Discovery of 'lost' battlefield

In October 2006, United States Army Colonel Douglas Mastriano, head of the Sergeant York Discovery Expedition (SYDE), conducted research to locate the York battle site. Among the Mastriano expedition's finds were 46 American rifle rounds. In addition, his research located pieces of German ammunition and weaponry. Without the official support of the French government, Mastriano excavated the site and bulldozed the area in order to build two monuments and a historic trail. Mastriano's research has been strongly disputed by other historians who point out numerous errors in the history dissertation and subsequent book that he published on York.

Another team led by Dr. Tom Nolan, head of the Sergeant York Project and a geographer at the R.O. Fullerton Laboratory for Spatial Technology at Middle Tennessee State University, placed the site 600 meters south of the location identified by Mastriano. Nolan's research relied on contemporary army graves registration Forms, the 82nd Division's wartime history, and maps drawn by Colonel G. Edward Buxton Jr. and Captain Edward C. B. Danforth, both of whom walked the ground with York during the Medal of Honor investigation.

Monuments and memorials
Many places and monuments throughout the world have been named in honor of York, most notably his farm in Pall Mall, which is now open to visitors as the Sgt. Alvin C. York State Historic Park.

Several government buildings have been named for York, including the Alvin C. York Veterans Hospital located in Murfreesboro.

The Alvin C. York Institute was founded in 1926 as an agricultural high school by York and residents of Fentress County and continues to serve as Jamestown's high school.

York Avenue on the Upper East Side of Manhattan, New York City was named for York in 1928.

Pulitzer Prize-winning author Robert Penn Warren used York as the model for characters in two of his novels, both explorations of the burden of fame faced by battlefield heroes in peacetime. In At Heaven's Gate (1943), a Tennessee mountaineer who was awarded the Medal of Honor in World War I returns from combat, becomes a state legislator, and then a bank president. Others exploit his decency and fame for their own selfish ends as the novel explores the real-life experience of an old-fashioned hero in a cynical world. In The Cave (1959), a similar hero from a similar background has aged and become an invalid. He struggles to maintain his identity as his real self diverges from the robust legend of his youth.

A statue of York by sculptor Felix de Weldon was placed on the grounds of the Tennessee State Capitol in 1968.

In the 1980s, the United States Army named its DIVAD weapon system "Sergeant York"; the project was cancelled because of technical problems and cost overruns.

In 1993, York was among 35 Medal of Honor recipients whose portraits were painted and biographies included in a boxed set of "Congressional Medal of Honor Trading Cards," issued by Eclipse Enterprises under license from the Medal of Honor Society. The text is by Kent DeLong, the paintings by Tom Simonton, and the set edited by Catherine Yronwode.

On May 5, 2000, the United States Postal Service issued the "Distinguished Soldiers" stamps, one of which honored York.

The riderless horse in the 2004 funeral procession of President Ronald Reagan was named Sergeant York.
Laura Cantrell's 2005 song "Old Downtown" talks about York in depth.

In 2007, the 82nd Airborne Division's movie theater at Fort Bragg, North Carolina, was named York Theater.

The traveling American football trophy between UT Martin, Austin Peay, Tennessee State, and Tennessee Tech is called the Alvin C. York trophy.

The U.S. Army ROTC's Sergeant York Award is presented to cadets who excel in the program and devote additional time and effort to maintaining and expanding it.

A memorial to graduates of the East Tennessee State University ROTC program who have given their lives for their country carries a quotation from York.

The Third Regiment of the Tennessee State Guard is named for York.

The Association of the United States Army published a digital graphic novel about York in 2018.

Swedish power metal band Sabaton's 2019 album The Great War contained a track titled "82nd All the Way" (What Sergeant York achieved that day, echoed from France to the USA, its 82nd all the way. Death from above is what they now say.) , a tribute to York's Medal of Honor action.

See also 
 List of Medal of Honor recipients for World War I
 List of members of the American Legion
 List of people from Tennessee 
 List of people on stamps of the United States

Notes

References

 
 
 Lee, David D. (2000) "York, Alvin Cullum" American National Biography (online 2000) online

Further reading
  online free
 
 Skeyhill, Thomas. Sergeant York: Last of the Long Hunters (1930);
 Yockelson, Mitchell. Forty-Seven Days: How Pershing's Warriors Came of Age to Defeat at the German Army in World War I. New York: NAL, Caliber, 2016. .

External links

 Official
 
 Alvin C. York Institute
 Sgt. Alvin C. York State Historic Park

 General information
 
 Alvin Cullum York (1887–1964) at Medal of Honor Recipients Portrayed On Film (lylefrancispadilla.com)
 
 Sergeant York Project
 The Sergeant York Discovery Expedition (SYDE)
 

1887 births
1964 deaths
American anti-communists
American community activists
American conscientious objectors
American diarists
American people of English descent
American people of Scotch-Irish descent
American Protestants
Burials in Tennessee
Chevaliers of the Légion d'honneur
Civilian Conservation Corps people
Military personnel from Tennessee
Organization founders
People from Harriman, Tennessee
People from Pall Mall, Tennessee
Recipients of the Croix de Guerre 1914–1918 (France)

Recipients of the War Merit Cross (Italy)
Sharpshooters
Tennessee Democrats
United States Army Medal of Honor recipients
United States Army personnel of World War I
United States Army personnel of World War II
United States Army soldiers
World War I recipients of the Medal of Honor